Lobachevskiy is a lunar impact crater that is located on the far side of the Moon, beyond the eastern limb. It was named after Russian mathematician Nikolai Lobachevsky in 1961. This crater lies to the southeast of the larger crater Fleming. Less than a crater diameter to the east-northeast lies Guyot.

This is a well-formed crater with features that have not been significantly eroded since Lobachevskiy was first formed. The rim and inner wall are nearly free of significant overlapping impacts, although the satellite crater Lobachevskiy M is attached to the southern outer rim. The inner walls display terrace features, along with some slumping along the upper edge.

Near the midpoint of the interior floor is a pair of central peaks, with one to the southeast and the other to the northwest of the middle. To the east of these peaks is a relatively bright, high-albedo patch that is most likely the result of a recent small impact.

Two dark ribbons of material apparently emanate from the base of a small crater in the western wall of Lobachevskiy, and this was observed on the Apollo 16 mission.

Prior to 1961 this crater was known as Crater 205.

Views

Satellite craters

By convention these features are identified on lunar maps by placing the letter on the side of the crater midpoint that is closest to Lobachevskiy.

References

 
 
 
 
 
 
 
 
 
 
 

Impact craters on the Moon